Dirkx is a surname. Notable people with the surname include:

 Austin Bibens-Dirkx (born 1985), American baseball player
 Jürgen Dirkx (born 1975), Dutch footballer
 Pieter Dirkx (born 1984), Belgian film director and painter

See also
 Dirk (name)

Dutch-language surnames
Patronymic surnames
Surnames from given names